Jamie Helleur (born 21 November 1983) is a former New Zealand-born Samoan rugby union player who last played for the Newcastle Falcons in the Aviva Premiership. He played as a centre and represented Samoa internationally.

Helleur made his debut for Auckland in 2004 and spent parts of seven seasons for the province, accumulating 44 appearances. He spent a single season in Super Rugby for the Blues in 2009, but was not retained for the following campaign.

For the 2011–12 season, Helleur signed in England with the Newcastle Falcons.

Helleur made his international debut for Samoa at the 2010 Pacific Nations Cup and impressed with his line-breaking abilities and strong tackling.

He has won the man of steel award for the Newcastle Falcons.

References

External links
Newcastle Falcons Profile
Blues profile

1983 births
Living people
Blues (Super Rugby) players
New Zealand rugby union players
Auckland rugby union players
North Harbour rugby union players
Rugby union players from Auckland
Newcastle Falcons players
Rugby union centres
Samoa international rugby union players
New Zealand sportspeople of Samoan descent
New Zealand expatriate rugby union players
Expatriate rugby union players in England
New Zealand expatriate sportspeople in England